Greenock Princes Pier was a railway station serving Greenock, Renfrewshire, Scotland, originally as part of the Greenock and Ayrshire Railway. It was approached by a tunnel sloping downhill under Greenock's west end, with railway sidings before the line crossed Brougham Street bridge over the main road to Gourock. The station was set on an embankment on the approach to Prince's Pier, with a line curving down to serve Albert Harbour. 

The area of the station, pier and the infilled Albert Harbour is now occupied by Greenock Ocean Terminal container port and cruise ship passenger terminal.

History
The station opened on 23 December 1869, as Greenock Albert Harbour. The station was set on an embankment, with an open path leading down to Prince's Pier. North British Railway through trains were advertised as running every week-day "between Edinburgh (Waverley and Haymarket Stations) and Greenock (Albert Harbour), carrying Passengers to and from Prince's Pier, Greenock, without change of Carriage, and thus placing them alongside the Clyde Steamers without walking through the streets." The station was renamed as Greenock Princes Pier on 1 May 1875. In 1877 the Glasgow and South Western Railway advertised that "Passengers are landed at the Prince's Pier Station, from whence there is a Covered Way to the Pier where the Steamers call, and Passengers Luggage is conveyed, free of charge, between the Stations and the Steamers."

 
On 25 May 1894 the original station was closed and replaced by a new station extended 90 m to the north.

On 2 February 1959, stopping passenger services from Glasgow and Paisley ceased running beyond Kilmacolm; however, the  boat trains continued running, without stopping until 30 November 1965.

References

Notes

Sources 
 
 
 
 
 
 Greenock Princes Pier on navigable OS map

Disused railway stations in Greenock
Railway stations in Great Britain opened in 1869
Railway stations in Great Britain closed in 1965
Former Glasgow and South Western Railway stations
Beeching closures in Scotland
1869 establishments in Scotland
James Miller railway stations